The First Division Knock-Out was a football competition contested by teams playing in the Maltese First Division. The competition was introduced for the 2006–07 season. There were four teams who compete in a preliminary round, with the two winners advancing to the quarter-finals with six other teams. The competition was continued in a knockout fashion.

Winners

 
Knock-out